Belippo is a genus of ant-mimicking African jumping spiders. The genus was first described by Eugène Louis Simon (30 April 1848- 17 November 1924) in 1910.

Species
 it contains twelve species, found only in Africa:
Belippo anguina Simon, 1910 (type) – São Tomé and Príncipe
Belippo attenuata Wesolowska & Haddad, 2014 – Lesotho
Belippo calcarata (Roewer, 1942) – Angola, Congo, Equatorial Guinea (Bioko), Kenya, South Africa
Belippo cygniformis Wanless, 1978 – Ghana
Belippo eburnensis Wesolowska & Wiśniewski, 2020 – Ivory Coast
Belippo elgonensis Wesolowska & Wiśniewski, 2015 – Kenya
Belippo ibadan Wanless, 1978 – Nigeria
Belippo meridionalis Wesolowska & Haddad, 2013 – South Africa
Belippo milloti (Lessert, 1942) – Nigeria, Congo, Kenya
Belippo nexilis (Simon, 1910) – São Tomé and Príncipe
Belippo pulchra Haddad & Wesolowska, 2013 – South Africa
Belippo terribilis Wesolowska & Wiśniewski, 2015 – Kenya
Belippo viettei (Kraus, 1960) – São Tomé and Príncipe

References

Salticidae genera
Salticidae
Spiders of Africa